Woodlawn High School is a four-year magnet high school in Birmingham, Alabama, United States. It is one of seven high schools in the Birmingham City School System. The school colors are green and gold, and the mascot is the Colonel. Woodlawn competes in AHSAA Class 6A athletics.

Athletics 
Woodlawn competes in AHSAA Class 6A athletics and currently fields teams in the following sports:
 Baseball
 Basketball
 Cross country
 Football
 Indoor track & field
 Outdoor track & field
 Volleyball

Notable alumni

 Doyle Alexander, former MLB player (Los Angeles Dodgers, Baltimore Orioles, New York Yankees, Texas Rangers, Atlanta Braves, San Francisco Giants, Toronto Blue Jays, Detroit Tigers)
 Fred Bohannon, former defensive back for the Pittsburgh Steelers
 Bobby Bowden, former head football coach at Florida State University
 Jim Carns, member of the Alabama House of Representatives
 Gregg Carr, former linebacker for the Pittsburgh Steelers
 Tom Cochran, former fullback for the Washington Redskins
 Ed Daniel, professional basketball player for Israeli team Maccabi Ashdod
 Karlos Dansby, linebacker for the Arizona Cardinals, Miami Dolphins, and Cleveland Browns
 Chris Davis, former Auburn University cornerback, involved in the game-ending play in Kick Bama Kick
 Vince Gibson, former head football coach at Kansas State University, University of Louisville, and Tulane University
 Harry Gilmer, former halfback for the Washington Redskins and Detroit Lions; head coach for Detroit Lions
 Art Hanes, former mayor of Birmingham
 Tim Harris, former linebacker for the Green Bay Packers, San Francisco 49ers, and Philadelphia Eagles
 Paul Hemphill, journalist and author
 Ricky Jones, former linebacker for the Cleveland Browns and Indianapolis Colts
 Tony Nathan, former running back for the Miami Dolphins
 Oliver Robinson, member of the Alabama House of Representatives and former guard for the San Antonio Spurs
 Rickey Smiley, comedian, actor, and radio personality
 Travis Tidwell, former quarterback for the New York Giants

References

External links 

 

School buildings completed in 1922
Educational institutions established in 1916
High schools in Birmingham, Alabama
Gothic Revival architecture in Alabama
Works Progress Administration in Alabama
Public high schools in Alabama
Schools in Jefferson County, Alabama
1916 establishments in Alabama